Tetrapriocera is a genus of horned powder-post beetles in the family Bostrichidae. There are at least four described species in Tetrapriocera.

Species
These four species belong to the genus Tetrapriocera:
 Tetrapriocera caprina Lesne, 1931
 Tetrapriocera defracta Lesne, 1901
 Tetrapriocera longicornis (Olivier, 1795)
 Tetrapriocera oceanina Lesne, 1901

References

Further reading

External links

 

Bostrichidae
Articles created by Qbugbot